Verzino is a comune and town in the province of Crotone, in Calabria, southern Italy.

Economy
Verzino relies on the production of oil, wine, cereals, citruses, and the breeding of the cattle.

References 

Verzino